Senator Waddell may refer to:

Joseph A. Waddell (1823–1914), Virginia State Senate
Joyce Waddell (born 1944), North Carolina State Senate
Richard W. Waddell (1922–2016), South Dakota State Senate

See also
William Garner Waddel (1870–1937), South Dakota State Senate